The 2018 Conference USA football season is the 23rd season of Conference USA football and part of the 2018 NCAA Division I FBS football season. The season will begin on August 25 and will end on November 24. This will be the fourth season under realignment that took place in 2014 NCAA Division I FBS football season which added the 14 member Charlotte from the Atlantic 10 Conference. C-USA is a "Group of Five" conference under the College Football Playoff format along with the American Athletic Conference, the Mid–American Conference, the Mountain West Conference and the Sun Belt Conference. The entire schedule was released on January 23.

The Conference consists of 14 members. The Conference USA Football Championship game will be played on December 1.

Preseason

Preseason awards
The conference preseason awards were released on July 16.

Preseason Offensive Player of the Year: Devin Singletary, Junior, RB, Florida Atlantic
Preseason Defensive Player of the Year: Azeez Al-Shaair, Senior, LB, Florida Atlantic
Preseason Special Teams Player of the Year: Parker Shaunfield, Senior, K, Southern Miss

Media predictions
The 2018 preseason media football poll was released on July 17.
East Division
1. Florida Atlantic (22 first-place votes)
2. Marshall (4) 
3. Middle Tennessee
4. FIU
5. Western Kentucky
6. Old Dominion
7. Charlotte
West Division
1. North Texas (18) 
2. Louisiana Tech (4)
3. UAB (3)
4. Southern Miss (1)
5. UTSA
T6. Rice
T6. UTEP

Head coaches
Note: All stats shown are before the beginning of the season.

Schedule

Regular season

Week Zero

Week One

Week Two

Week Three

Week Four

Week Five

Week Six

Week Seven

Week Eight

Week Nine

Week Ten

Week Eleven

Week Twelve

Week Thirteen

Week Fourteen

This game was added after both teams lost a game due to being canceled by Hurricane Florence. Virginia Tech was to play East Carolina while Marshall was to play South Carolina.

Conference USA Championship Game

Postseason

Bowl games

Bowls based on contractual tie-ins. Actual bowls attended by C-USA members may vary and will be announced following the regular season.

Awards and honors

Individual awards

All conference teams

Non-conference records

Power Five conferences

Group of Five conferences

FBS independents

FCS conferences

Home game attendance

Bold – Exceed capacity
†Season High

Weekly Awards

References